The Nelson Railway Society operates a short heritage railway line in the Founders Heritage Park, Nelson, New Zealand.

The society has recovered and now utilises station buildings from a couple of former stations on the Nelson Section, including the Tui Railway Station building.

The society uses a DSA class diesel locomotive on running days, and restored a WF class steam locomotive WF 403. 403 has not yet been steamed nor is in usual service due to its six driving wheels being unable to negotiate the curves of the society's line.

The society was originally incorporated as the "Grand Tapawera Railroad Company" with the intention of establishing and operating a line on the original formation of the Nelson Section near Motupiko.

Rolling Stock

External links
 Nelson Railway Society

Heritage railways in New Zealand
Rail transport in Nelson, New Zealand
Tourist attractions in the Nelson Region